Inchang High School, also known as Inchang-Go() or Seoul Inchang-Go() is one of the oldest private high schools in Seoul, South Korea founded in 1922.

References 
 Official Website

High schools in Seoul
Seodaemun District
Private schools in South Korea
Educational institutions established in 1922
1922 establishments in Korea